Raivis Zīmelis (born 18 August 1976) is a Latvian biathlete. He competed in the men's sprint event at the 2006 Winter Olympics.
He ended his professional career in 2006. Later he turned to Mountain bike racing and became a Latvian champion in 2015.

References

1976 births
Living people
Latvian male biathletes
Olympic biathletes of Latvia
Biathletes at the 2006 Winter Olympics
People from Madona